This article describes some of the 2017 seasons of TCR Series across the world.

VLN TCR Class

The 2017 Veranstaltergemeinschaft Langstreckenpokal Nürburgring TCR Class was the first season for the TCR Class in the championship.

Teams and drivers

Drivers with an asterisk on their "Rounds" column took part in the non-championship 2017 24 Hours Nürburgring round.

Calendar and results

TCR Baltic Trophy

The 2017 TCR Baltic Trophy is the first season of the TCR Baltic Trophy. TCR Baltic Trophy will run within the Baltic Touring Car Championship events.

Teams and drivers

Calendar and results
The 2017 schedule was announced on 13 December 2016. The calendar includes two rounds in Latvia and one in Estonia.

References

External links
 
 

TCR Series

TCR Series